Docking may refer to:

In science and technology
 Docking and berthing of spacecraft, the process of joining one spacecraft or space station module to another
 Docking (molecular), a research technique for predicting the relative orientation of two molecules to each other
 Docking@Home, a distributed computing project
 Docking, a synonym for accretion in geology

Other uses
 Docking (surname)
 Docking, Norfolk, a village
 Docking (animal), the practice of cutting off or trimming the tail of an animal
Docking (dog), the above practice as specifically applies to dogs
 Docking, the similar mutilation of humans, e.g. as corporal punishment
 Docking, the piercing of dough as it is manipulated, sometimes with a tool such as a Roller docker
 Docking (sex), a sex act

See also
 Dock (disambiguation)
 Docker (disambiguation)